The Colleen Bawn is a 1924 British silent drama film directed by W. P. Kellino and starring Henry Victor, Colette Brettel and Stewart Rome. It is an adaptation of the 1860 Irish play The Colleen Bawn by Dion Boucicault.

Plot
In Ireland a poor aristocrat hires a half-wit to drown his secret wife so he can wed an heiress.

Cast
 Henry Victor – Hardress Cregan 
 Colette Brettel – Eily O'Connor 
 Stewart Rome – Myles na Coppaleen 
 Gladys Jennings – Anne Chute 
 Clive Currie – Denny Mann 
 Marie Ault – Sheelah 
 Marguerite Leigh – Mrs. Cregan 
 Aubrey Fitzgerald – Sir Patrick Chute 
 Dave O'Toole – Mike

References

Bibliography
 Low, Rachael. History of the British Film, 1918–1929. George Allen & Unwin, 1971.

External links

1924 films
1920s historical drama films
British silent feature films
British historical drama films
Films directed by W. P. Kellino
Films set in Ireland
Films set in the 19th century
British films based on plays
Stoll Pictures films
British black-and-white films
1924 drama films
1920s English-language films
1920s British films
Silent drama films